Osvaldo Lucas Vázquez (born 28 May 1977) is a retired Mexican football player who played as a defender.

Lucas made his professional debut on 3 August 2003 for Irapuato FC, before moving to Atlante during the summer of 2004.

During the winter transfer window of the 2007-08, Lucas became the first Mexican to play in the Azerbaijan Premier League buy signing for Standard Baku. His debut came on 17 February 2008 in a 1–0 defeat away to Gabala.

Career statistics

References

External links

Living people
1977 births
Footballers from Tamaulipas
Sportspeople from Tampico, Tamaulipas
Expatriate footballers in Azerbaijan
FK Standard Sumgayit players
Mexican footballers
Association football defenders
Mexican expatriate sportspeople in Azerbaijan